Bhumika Giri is a Nepalese folk singer. She is popularly known as Stage Queen because of her stage performances. As of July 2016, Giri has recorded over 300 songs.

Early life 
Giri was born in Dang to parents Hemraj Giri and Anju Giri.

Career 
Bhumika Giri who is popular for stage performances, has performed in UK and other several countries. She made her first stage performance in Qatar.

Discography 
 Lauka Chakhne Mauka Deu
 Teejle Garayo (2015)
 Gorakhpurko Salai (2017)
 Diyeu Churot (2017)
 Mayakai Piralo (2018)
 Tara Sangai Jun (2018)
 Bikriti (2018)
 Basaiko Tama
 Aajai Bhagi Jam (2019)

Awards 
 2017: Sundaradevi Sandesh Music Award
 2017: Himalayan International Nepali Music Award - Best classical singer
 2018: Rapti Music Award
 2018: Kalika Music Award
 2019: Himalayan International Music Award

References

External links 
 
 

Year of birth missing (living people)
Living people
Nepalese folk singers
People from Dang District, Nepal